{{DISPLAYTITLE:δ18O}}
In  geochemistry, paleoclimatology and paleoceanography δ18O or delta-O-18 is a measure of the ratio of stable isotopes  oxygen-18 (18O) and oxygen-16 (16O). 
It is commonly used as a measure of the temperature of precipitation, as a measure of groundwater/mineral interactions, and as an indicator of processes that show isotopic fractionation, like methanogenesis. 
In paleosciences, 18O:16O data from corals, foraminifera and ice cores are used as a proxy for temperature.

The definition is, in "per mil" (‰, parts per thousand):
 ‰
where the standard has a known isotopic composition, such as Vienna Standard Mean Ocean Water (VSMOW).   The fractionation can arise from kinetic, equilibrium, or mass-independent fractionation.

Mechanism 

Foraminifera shells are composed of calcium carbonate (CaCO3) and are found in many common geological environments. The ratio of 18O to 16O in the shell is used to indirectly determine the temperature of the surrounding water at the time the shell was formed. The ratio varies slightly depending on the temperature of the surrounding water, as well as other factors such as the water's salinity, and the volume of water locked up in ice sheets.

 also reflects local evaporation and freshwater input, as rainwater is 16O-enriched—a result of the preferential evaporation of the lighter 16O from seawater. Consequently, the surface ocean contains greater proportions of 18O around the subtropics and tropics where there is more evaporation, and lesser proportions of 18O in the mid-latitudes where it rains more.

Similarly, when water vapor condenses, heavier water molecules holding 18O atoms tend to condense and precipitate first. The water vapor gradient heading from the tropics to the poles gradually becomes more and more depleted of 18O. Snow falling in Canada has much less H218O than rain in Florida; similarly, snow falling in the center of ice sheets has a lighter  signature than that at its margins, since heavier 18O precipitates first.

Changes in climate that alter global patterns of evaporation and precipitation therefore change the background  ratio.

Solid samples (organic and inorganic) for oxygen isotope analysis are usually stored in silver cups and measured with pyrolysis and mass spectrometry. Researchers need to avoid improper or prolonged storage of the samples for accurate measurements.

Extrapolation of temperature
Based on the simplifying assumption that the signal can be attributed to temperature change alone, with the effects of salinity and ice volume change ignored, Epstein et al. (1953) estimated that 
a  increase of 0.22‰ is equivalent to a cooling of 1 °C (or 1.8 °F).  
More precisely, Epstein et al. (1953) give a quadratic extrapolation for the temperature, as 

where T is the temperature in °C (based on a least-squares fit for a range of temperature values between 9 °C and 29 °C, with a standard deviation of ±0.6 °C, and δ is δ18O for a calcium carbonate sample).

Paleoclimatology

Ice Cores 
δ18O can be used with ice cores to determine the temperature from when the ice was formed.

Lisiecki and Raymo (2005) used measurements of δ18O in benthic foraminifera from 57 globally distributed deep sea sediment cores, taken as a proxy for the total global mass of glacial ice sheets, to reconstruct the climate for the past five million years.

The stacked record of the 57 cores was orbitally tuned to an orbitally driven ice model, the Milankovitch cycles of 41 ky (obliquity), 26 ky (precession) and 100 ky (eccentricity), which are all assumed to cause orbital forcing of global ice volume. Over the past million years, there have been a number of very strong glacial maxima and minima, spaced by roughly 100 ky.
As the observed isotope variations are similar in shape to the temperature variations recorded for the past 420 ky at Vostok Station, the figure shown on the right aligns the values of δ18O (right scale) with the reported temperature variations from the Vostok ice core  (left scale), following Petit et al. (1999).

Biomineralized tissues 
δ18O from biomineralized tissues may also be used in reconstructing past environmental conditions. In vertebrates, apatite from bone mineral, tooth enamel and dentin contains phosphate [PO4]3− groups which may preserve the oxygen isotope ratios of environmental water. Fractionation of oxygen isotopes in these tissues may be affected by biological factors such as body temperature and diet.

See also
 
 
 
 Isotopic signature
 Isotope analysis
 Isotope geochemistry
 Paleothermometer
 Stable isotope ratio

References

Bioindicators
Isotopes of oxygen
Environmental isotopes
Geochemistry